Bowls Australia is the governing body for the sport of bowls in Australia. Bowls Australia is responsible for the leadership, development and management of lawn bowls in Australia. It is a not-for-profit organisation governed by a voluntary board that provides the strategic direction for the sport and the strategies that are implemented by the staff at the national office.

Bowls Australia's members are the nine state and territory bowls associations.

There are over 2,000 clubs and 240,000 registered participants affiliated with member states and territories. In addition there are many social bowlers participating in competitions across Australia.

Bowls Australia is affiliated with World Bowls and the Australian Commonwealth Games Association where it is a core sport in the Commonwealth Games held every four years.

History

In 1911, Bowls Australia, originally known as the Australian Bowling Council, was formed at conference of state delegates in Melbourne.

The first Australian Championships under the new body were held in 1912, and the first Australian representative side played in New Zealand in 1914.

In 1928, the Australian Bowls Council became affiliated with the International Bowling Board, now known as World Bowls Inc.

The first World Bowls Championship  was played at Kyeemagh Bowls Club (NSW) in 1966.

Structure
The national body has eight state member associations:
 Bowls Australian Capital Territory
 Bowls Queensland
 Bowls NSW
 Bowls Northern Territory
 Bowls Western Australia
 Bowls Victoria
 Bowls South Australia
 Bowls Tasmania

The main competitions BA organises are the annual Australian Open (AO), Bowls Premier League (BPL) and BPL Cup. They also stage a number of other important national competitions as well as hosting international events in Australia including the upcoming World Bowls 2020 Championships.

References

External links
 

Bowls in Australia
Sports governing bodies in Australia
1911 establishments in Australia
Sports organizations established in 1911
Bowling organizations